Tommy is the fifth solo studio album by American multi-insturmentalist Dosh. It was released on Anticon on April 13, 2010.

Andrew Bird contributed vocals on "Number 41" and "Nevermet". "Airlift" contains a sample of Dosh and his friend covering "Run Like Hell" by Pink Floyd. The album is named after and dedicated to Tom Cesario.

Critical reception
At Metacritic, which assigns a weighted average score out of 100 to reviews from mainstream critics, the album received an average score of 76% based on 11 reviews, indicating "generally favorable reviews".

Zach Cole of URB gave the album 4 stars out of 5, saying, "Dosh's focus on Tommy falls on the elegance of the music first and foremost, and the tracks evoke warmth as they evolve in sequence." He added, "Dosh pays particular attention to the delicate balance of the instruments on each track, making sure that no one sound overpowers another." M. R. Newmark of PopMatters gave the album 7 stars out of 10, saying: "This is Dosh taking a step back, slowing down, freaking out a little (check the snarling ending of album finale 'Gare de Lyon'), and making the most personal music of his career."

Track listing

Personnel
Credits adapted from liner notes.

 Martin Dosh – everything else
 Mike Lewis – backing vocals (1, 3), saxophone (1, 4, 8), synthesizer (2), piano (3, 5, 6, 7), bass guitar (5, 8, 10), glockenspiel (5)
 Jeremy Ylvisaker – electric guitar (2, 3, 4, 5, 6), backing vocals (3), synthesizer (3), slide guitar (8), feedback guitar (10)
 Ryan Francesconi – accordion (7), guitar (7, 8, 9, 10), bass guitar (7, 9), banjo (10), tambura (10)
 Mike Sopko – acoustic guitar (1), electric guitar (1)
 Chris Morrissey – electric bass (1, 4, 6)
 Todd Sickafoose – acoustic bass (2, 9)
 Jon Davis – microphone (3), bass sample (3)
 Paul Niehaus – pedal steel guitar (3)
 Andrew Bird – vocals (3, 9), lyrics (3, 9)
 Bryan Olson – guitar (4)
 Derek Phillips – drums (4)
 Freddy Votel – percussion (5, 8, 10)
 J.T. Bates – cymbal (6)
 Tim Glenn – prepared piano (7)

References

Further reading

External links
 

2010 albums
Dosh albums
Anticon albums